Blastobasis marmorosella is a moth in the family Blastobasidae. It is found on the Canary Islands, Madeira and in Portugal and Spain. This species has been accidentally introduced to Australia and New Zealand.

Taxonomy
This species was first described by Thomas Vernon Wollaston in 1858 and named Oecophora marmorosella. In 1892 Hans Rebel placed this species within the genus Blastobasis. In 2004 this species was reviewed. The female lectotype, collected in Madeira, is held in the Natural History Museum, London.

Description 
This species was described in 2004 by Ole Karsholt and Sergey Yu Sinev as follows:

Distribution 
This species is likely indigenous to Madeira and Porto Santo. It was first recorded in New Zealand in 1988 and in the 19 years since that first record only 8 specimens have been collected.

References

Moths described in 1858
Blastobasis
Moths of New Zealand
Taxa named by Thomas Vernon Wollaston